Hall v. Geiger-Jones Co., 242 U.S. 539 (1917), is a United States Supreme Court case in which the Court upheld individual states' power to regulate the offer, sale, and purchase of securities.  Such regulatory laws are commonly known today as "blue-sky laws"; the phrase is often said to be based on this opinion, although speculative securities were described as "blue sky" in sources published prior to this opinion. The opinion itself said:

The decision rejected the notion of an arbitrary and capricious power accruing to state securities commissioners.  The opinion author, Justice Joseph McKenna, reasoned such a broad delegation to state official was justified because valuing securities is "a complex problem" and requires skill and expertise often not available to the individual investor. Justice McKenna wrote of checks on government abuse because, "an adverse judgment by the commissioner is reviewable by the courts."

External links 
 

United States securities case law
1917 in United States case law
United States Supreme Court cases
United States Supreme Court cases of the White Court